Douglas Joseph Warren (21 March 1919 – 6 February 2013) was an Australian bishop of the Roman Catholic Church.  At the time of his death he was, at the age of 93, the oldest Australian Roman Catholic bishop.

Warren was born in Canowindra, New South Wales, Australia and ordained a priest 20 December 1942, in the Diocese of Wilcannia-Forbes. He was appointed auxiliary bishop of the same diocese, as well as titular bishop of Aquae Novae in Numidia, 16 June 1964, and ordained a bishop by Cardinal Sir Norman Thomas Gilroy 27 July 1964 and co-consecrators Bishop Bryan Gallagher of Port Pirie and Bishop Bernard Stewart of Sandhurst. He was appointed the diocesan bishop 26 September 1967, and held the post until his retirement, 30 March 1994.

References

External links
Catholic-Hierarchy
Wilcannia-Forbes Diocese

20th-century Roman Catholic bishops in Australia
Roman Catholic bishops of Wilcannia–Forbes
Participants in the Second Vatican Council
1919 births
2013 deaths